Jhalda station, station code JAA, is the railway station serving the city of Jhalda which is in the Purulia district in the Indian state of West Bengal. Jhalda railway station belongs to the  Ranchi division of the South Eastern Railway zone of the Indian Railways.

Facilities 
The major facilities available are waiting rooms, retiring room, computerized reservation facility, reservation counter, and vehicle parking. The vehicles are allowed to enter the station premises. Security personnel from the Government Railway police (G.R.P) are present for security.

Platforms
The platforms  are interconnected with foot overbridge (FOB).

Trains 
Several electrified local passenger trains also run from Jhalda to neighbouring destinations on frequent intervals.

Nearest airports
The nearest airports to Jhalda Station are:

Birsa Munda Airport, Ranchi  
Gaya Airport, Gaya 
Lok Nayak Jayaprakash Airport, Patna 
Netaji Subhas Chandra Bose International Airport, Kolkata

See also 

 Jhalda

References

External links 
 Jhalda Station Map
 Official website of the Purulia district

Railway stations in Purulia district
Ranchi railway division